Ian Moore (born 11 November 1938) is an Irish racing cyclist. He rode in the 1961 Tour de France.

References

1938 births
Living people
Irish male cyclists
Place of birth missing (living people)